The 2020 Men's U20 Volleyball European Championship was the 27th edition of the Men's Junior European Volleyball Championship, organised by Europe's governing volleyball body, the CEV. The tournament was held in Brno and Kuřim, Czech Republic from 26 September to 4 October 2020. The top two teams of the tournament qualified for the 2021 FIVB Volleyball Men's U21 World Championship as the CEV representatives. But with runners-up Italy hosting the 2021 U21 World Championship together with Bulgaria, 3rd place Belgium joined the field for the 2021 U21 World Championship as well.

Players must be born on or after 1 January 2001.

Qualification

The second and third round qualification were canceled due to the COVID-19 pandemic and the remaining eleven spots were allocated according to the Men's U20 CEV European Ranking as of 1 June 2019. But, Turkey and Ukraine withdrew just before the beginning of the tournament because a small number of their players tested positive for the novel coronavirus shortly upon arrival in the Czech Republic.

Hosts

Top eleven ranked teams from the Men's U20 CEV European Ranking as of 1 June 2019 which had not yet qualified

Pools composition
Hosts Czech Republic and Russia, the top team from the Men's U20 CEV European Ranking as of 1 June 2019, were directly placed as head of pool I and II respectively. All teams not seeded were placed to five pots as based on their Men's U20 CEV European Ranking as of 1 June 2019 position and drawn accordingly into pool I and II. In case several teams shared the same position, the teams were seeded as per the final standing of the 2018 Men's U20 European Championship. The draw was held in Luxembourg City, Luxembourg on 27 August 2020. But, Turkey and Ukraine withdrew after the draw. Rankings are shown in brackets except the hosts who ranked 5th.

Draw

Squads

Venues
 Kuřim Sport Hall, Kuřim, Czech Republic – Pool I
 Sportovní hala Vodova, Brno, Czech Republic – Pool I, II and Final round

Pool standing procedure
 Number of matches won
 Match points
 Sets ratio
 Points ratio
 If the tie continues as per the point ratio between two teams, the priority will be given to the team which won the match between them. When the tie in points ratio is between three or more teams, a new classification of these teams in the terms of points 1, 2, 3 and 4 will be made taking into consideration only the matches in which they were opposed to each other.

Match won 3–0 or 3–1: 3 match points for the winner, 0 match points for the loser
Match won 3–2: 2 match points for the winner, 1 match point for the loser

Preliminary round
All times are Central European Summer Time (UTC+02:00).

Pool I

|}

|}

Pool II

|}

|}

Final round
All times are Central European Summer Time (UTC+02:00).

5th–8th places

5th–8th semifinals

|}

7th place match

|}

5th place match

|}

Final four

Semifinals

|}

3rd place match

|}

Final

|}

Final standing

Awards

Most Valuable Player
 Alessandro Michieletto
Best Setter
 Paolo Porro
Best Outside Spikers
 Tommaso Rinaldi
 Omar Kurbanov

Best Middle Blockers
 Wout D'Heer
 Iurii Brazhniuk
Best Opposite Spiker
 Ferre Reggers
Best Libero
 Ilia Fedorov

See also
2020 Women's U19 Volleyball European Championship

References

External links
Official website

Men's Junior European Volleyball Championship
European Championship U20
Volleyball European Championship U20
Volleyball European Championship U20
International volleyball competitions hosted by the Czech Republic
Volleyball European Championship U20
Volleyball European Championship U20